MakeOffices is an American coworking and real estate service company. Its main clientele are small business teams, such as start-up companies and small-time entrepreneurs, that require flexible office space solutions. The company currently operates in three cities: Chicago, Philadelphia, and the Washington, DC Metro areas.

Background
The company was founded by Ray Rahbar, Jason Shrensky, Chris Junior and several others in 2012. The idea of an office-sharing start-up was initially conceived in 2007. The idea behind it was for start-ups to have less expenses to incur when creating a fresh company, since buying or leasing an office is a big financial burden for many new businesses. The company was funded by several angel investors, several entrepreneurs and the CYwP Fund.

The company opened first an 8,500 square feet shared co-office space at 1401 Wilson Blvd., Arlington, Virginia with 25 offices. It was later occupied by 47 tech company startups. This was followed by an office in the Tysons area of McLean, Virginia in June 2013, with 16,000 square feet and 47 offices. The third location was opened in the Dupont Circle area of Washington D.C. with 40,000 square feet, containing 103 offices.

In August 2013, United States Senator Mark Warner from Virginia visited the Rosslyn office to talk to tenants and media members about the startup growth in the region.

In November 2015, the company changed its name to MakeOffices.

In January 2016, MakeOffices expanded into Chicago and opened the first of its 3 coworking and shared office spaces in River North. It also opened in Philadelphia's Center neighborhood at the same time.

Service
The company offers office spaces that are leased on a month-to-month basis. The advantage of leasing an office space in MakeOffices is that it is less expensive than owning or renting an office space.  Also, with a month-to-month rental agreement, companies are not locked into an extensive unbreakable lease, giving startups more flexibility.  Executive offices and suites and virtual offices are also available through MakeOffices.

References

External links
 MakeOffices Official website

Companies based in McLean, Virginia
Real estate services companies of the United States
Real estate companies established in 2012
Real estate companies based in Washington, D.C.
Leasing companies
Coworking space providers
2012 establishments in Virginia